Thunderclap Newman were  an English rock band that Pete Townshend of the Who and Kit Lambert formed in 1969 in a bid to showcase the talents of John "Speedy" Keen, Jimmy McCulloch, and Andy "Thunderclap" Newman.

Their single, "Something in the Air", a 1969 UK number one hit, remains in demand for television commercials, film soundtracks and compilations. The band released a critically acclaimed rock album, Hollywood Dream, and three other singles (which appeared on the album), "Accidents", "The Reason" and "Wild Country".

From 1969 until 1971, the nucleus of the band consisted of the songwriter John "Speedy" Keen (vocals, drums, guitar), Andy "Thunderclap" Newman (piano) and Jimmy McCulloch (guitar). Pete Townshend (using the alias "Bijou Drains") played bass guitar on their album and singles, all of which he had recorded and produced at the IBC Studio and his Twickenham home studio. The band augmented its personnel during its tours: in 1969 with James "Jim" Pitman-Avery (bass guitar) and Jack McCulloch (drums);. The band folded in April 1971 but was resurrected by Andy Newman with a new group in 2010.

The most current Thunderclap Newman group was formed in February 2010 at the instigation of music business manager Ian Grant. The lineup of the band was Andy Newman, Mark Brzezicki, Nick Johnson, Josh Townshend and Tony Stubbings. They recorded and released an album in 2010 titled Beyond Hollywood.

Career
In 1969, Townshend created the band to showcase songs written by the former Who chauffeur, drummer/singer/guitarist Speedy Keen. Keen wrote the opening track on The Who Sell Out album, "Armenia City in the Sky". Keen, Newman and McCulloch met each other for the first time in December 1968 or January 1969 at Townshend's home studio to record "Something in the Air". Townshend produced the single, played its bass guitar under the pseudonym Bijou Drains and hired GPO engineer and Dixieland jazz pianist "Thunderclap" Newman (born Andrew Laurence Newman, 21 November 1942, Hounslow, Middlesex, died 29 March 2016) and the fifteen-year-old Glaswegian guitarist Jimmy McCulloch. Before then, Townshend had planned to work on projects for each of the musicians, but Kit Lambert prevailed upon Townshend, who was working on what became the rock-opera Tommy, to save time by coalescing the three musicians into the collective project that became Thunderclap Newman.

"Something in the Air", which Keen wrote, was number one on the UK Singles Chart for three weeks, replacing the Beatles' "Ballad of John and Yoko" and holding off Elvis Presley. Originally titled "Revolution", but later renamed because the Beatles had released a song of that name in 1968 (the B-side of "Hey Jude"). By December 1969, the single was awarded a gold disc for world sales of more than a million.

"Something in the Air" appeared on the soundtracks of the films The Magic Christian (1969) and The Strawberry Statement (1970), the latter having helped the single reach number 25 in the United States. In the UK and US, a follow-up single, "Accidents", came out in May 1970 and charted at No. 44 for only a week, but not charting at all in the US. "Something in the Air" was also in the film Kingpin (1996) and is used on the soundtrack. It was also used in Almost Famous (2000) and is on the soundtrack. It was also used in a 2008 television episode of My Name Is Earl.

The critic Nathan Morley described "Accidents" as the band's masterpiece. "One would", he wrote, "have to listen to Wagner in a funeral parlour for something even more morbid than Thunderclap Newman’s 'Accidents', which chronicles the deaths of various hapless children who all meet a very nasty end – Poor Mary falls in a river whilst waiting for the Queen to sail by and little Johnny is killed by a speeding car. That said, the song, orchestration and performance are simply brilliant. It is captivating and without doubt their best recording."

Thunderclap Newman had not planned to undertake live performances, but the band relented when, to their collective surprise, "Something in the Air" became a chart success. The trio, augmented by Jim Pitman-Avery (bass guitar) and McCulloch's elder brother Jack (drums), undertook a 26-date tour of England and Scotland in support of Deep Purple from July 1969 to August 1969. On 8 August, Pitman-Avery and McCulloch announced their intention to leave the band. Within weeks, they had formed the country-rock band Wild Country with Terry Keyworth (guitar) and Stuart Whitcombe (keyboards). That year, the band appeared in television programmes in Britain (How Late It Is, Top of the Pops) and Germany (Beat-Club).

In October 1970, Thunderclap Newman released its critically acclaimed album, Hollywood Dream. Produced by Townshend, the album peaked at #163 on the Billboard 200. That year, they released three singles: "Accidents/I See It All", "The Reason/Stormy Petrel" and "Wild Country/Hollywood Dream". On 7 November, they appeared on Ev (a.k.a., The Kenny Everett Show). In early 1971, the founding trio reformed with the Australian musicians Roger Felice (drums) and Ronnie Peel (bass guitar).

On 6 March 1971, the New Musical Express reported the band's personnel change: "Thunderclap Newman has finally settled down into a five-piece group, with two new members being brought in—although on certain dates, the outfit may be augmented by a brass section. Permanent line-up now comprises Newman (piano), Speedy Keen (rhythm guitar and vocals), Jimmy McCulloch (lead guitar), Ronnie Peel (bass) and Roger Felice (drums). Dates include University of Sussex (tomorrow, Saturday), Sheffield University (12 March) and Nelson Imperial (14). A Scottish tour is being set for the end of April."
 
With its new line-up, from January 1971 to April 1971 Thunderclap Newman supported Deep Purple during a 19-date tour of England and Scotland. At some time during those months, the band supported Leon Russell during a tour of the Netherlands and they had supported Deep Purple during a tour of Scandinavia. They played the club circuit and had avoided playing in ballrooms. That year, Thunderclap Newman made a cameo appearance in the British movie Not Tonight, Darling.

Thunderclap Newman broke up around 10 April 1971, days before they were scheduled to start a tour of Scotland and weeks before they were scheduled to be part of a package tour with Marsha Hunt and others during the Who's 12-week tour of the US.

The members of the band had little in common. In a 1972 NME interview, Newman said that he got on with Keen's music but not with Keen personally, while the exact opposite was true with regard to McCulloch.

In 2008, Newman appeared on an episode of the British television programme Those Were The Days to comment upon the night of the first moon landing, when Thunderclap Newman had performed an almost-nightlong concert.

Separate ways
McCulloch had stints with a dozen or more bands, including John Mayall, Stone the Crows, and Paul McCartney's Wings but, at the age of 26, he died in his home of heroin-induced cardiac arrest on 25 September 1979.  His body was discovered by his brother, Jack, two days later.

In 1973, Keen released a solo album for Track, entitled Previous Convictions, which featured McCulloch and Roger Felice on some tracks. He began recording a double album as a follow-up. Frustrated by his lack of progress at Track, he took the demos to Island Records, which pared it down to the single album Y'know Wot I Mean? and released it in 1975. Its single, "Someone to Love", received plenty of airplay but failed to sell.

Discouraged, Keen ceased recording after one more single in 1976. He tried his hand at record producing, working with the punk band Johnny Thunders and the Heartbreakers on their first album L.A.M.F. in 1977, and also produced Motörhead's first album before leaving the music industry. He appears on several tracks on the best of Motorhead double CD All the Aces, as part of a live set originally performed under the name the Muggers. The set includes five songs written and sung by Keen, only one of which had appeared on his solo albums.

Keen suffered from arthritis for several years, and was recording his third solo album, when he unexpectedly died of heart failure at the age of 56 on 12 March 2002.

In 1971, Newman recorded a solo album, Rainbow, and he played assorted instruments on Roger Ruskin Spear's first album.

In 2002, Newman was eventually coaxed out of retirement by István Etiam and David Buckley (ex-Barracudas). Another three musicians were added to the line-up and in late 2005 the Thunderclap Newman Band was formed. It was an international collection of six musicians of various nationalities and with different musical backgrounds. Under the leadership of Andy Newman, the band set out to celebrate the music of Thunderclap Newman and to honour the legacy of John 'Speedy' Keen and Jimmy McCulloch.

One of the aims of the band was to perform Hollywood Dream for the first time ever in its entirety, alongside material written by Keen and McCulloch after Thunderclap Newman had gone their separate ways. With two more songwriters, David Buckley and István Etiam, there were plans to add new songs to the existing material.

In February 2008, former music critic of The Times, David Sinclair, supported the Thunderclap Newman Band at the Windmill in Brixton, London with his band, the David Sinclair Trio (now David Sinclair Four). In his band blog he said: "Of the original guys who made the record (Hollywood Dream), only the keyboard player is alive, which is tragic. Newman was already something of an eccentric in 1969. He has gathered an endearingly quirky bunch of talented, multi-national musicians around him who were some of the friendliest people we have encountered on the circuit."

New York Waste Magazine reviewed Thunderclap Newman Band's gig at the Half Moon in Putney, London in March 2008: "This was the big return for Thunderclap Newman, the band with the big hit Something in the Air. Andy Newman has resurfaced with a great new band performing all the great songs from the back catalog and some new ones too. Andy and his band sounded great and there is definitely Something in the Air!"

Despite good press reviews and numerous successful performances, disagreements within the band started to emerge. Andy Newman accepted an offer from Big Country's manager Ian Grant to assemble a new band around him and in March 2010 the Thunderclap Newman Band was disbanded.

The Thunderclap Newman Band was: Andy 'Thunderclap' Newman (UK) – keyboards, soprano sax, clarinet, oboe, David Buckley (US) – vocals, guitar, István Etiam (HU) – rhythm guitar, lap-steel guitar, harmonica & vocals, Stefanos Tsourelis (GR) – lead guitar, Brian Jackson (UK) – bass guitar, Antonio Spano (I) – drums.

In February 2010, Newman performed as Thunderclap Newman at the Con Club in Lewes, Sussex, with a new line-up: Tony Stubbings (bass guitar), Nick Johnson (lead guitar), Mark Brzezicki (former Big Country, drums) and Josh Townshend (nephew of Pete Townshend, on rhythm guitar and vocals). Soon thereafter, the band released a CD entitled Beyond Hollywood, a live album with three studio re-rerecordings of Thunderclap Newman songs. Thunderclap Newman supported Big Country on a 2011 tour of the UK. The band played 15 concerts between 2010 and 2012, the last one in June 2012 at the Isle of Wight festival; this was the last one ever, and after that the band stopped performing.

Andy "Thunderclap" Newman died on 29 March 2016, at the age of 73.

Discography

Studio album

Live album

Singles

See also
List of artists who reached number one on the UK Singles Chart
List of performers on Top of the Pops
UK No.1 Hits of 1969
List of NME covers
List of 1960s one-hit wonders in the United States

References

Bibliography

External links
 
Sleeve notes on CD re-issue of Y'Know Wot I Mean? (Edsel EDCD 462)
Obituary

Musical groups established in 1969
Musical groups disestablished in 1970
Musical groups from London
English rock music groups
The Who